Anolis oxylophus, the stream  anole, is a species of lizard in the family Dactyloidae. The species is found in Costa Rica, Nicaragua, Panama, and Honduras.

References

Anoles
Reptiles described in 1875
Taxa named by Edward Drinker Cope